Elizabeth McGorian is a Zimbabwean ballerina. She is a Principal Character Artist with the Royal Ballet, London.

Early life
Elizabeth McGorian was born in Zambia and grew up in Zimbabwe, where she studied at the Mercia Hetherington School. She joined the Royal Ballet School in 1976.

Career
McGorian joined the Royal Ballet in 1977. She was promoted to soloist in 1991 and principal character artist in 1997.

References

Zimbabwean ballerinas
Dancers of The Royal Ballet
Living people
People educated at the Royal Ballet School
Year of birth missing (living people)